道 may refer to:
Dao (political), an administrative division in China, Japan, or Korea
Provinces of Korea, the primary administrative division of Korea since the mid Goryeo dynasty in the early 11th century
Administrative divisions of North Korea
Administrative divisions of South Korea
Taoism, a variety of related Chinese philosophical and religious traditions and concepts
Tao, the order of the Universe in Taoism
Dō (Way), any one of a number of spiritual or martial disciplines of East Asia
Michi (Exile song), a J-pop single by the band Exile, released in 2007

See also 
 Dao (disambiguation)